Venture For America (VFA) is an American nonprofit organization and fellowship headquartered in Detroit. Founded by Andrew Yang in 2011, its mission is "to create economic opportunity in American cities" by training recent graduates and young professionals to work for startups in emerging cities throughout the United States.

History

In its first year, 2012, Venture for America placed 40 fellows in five cities: Cincinnati, Detroit, Las Vegas, New Orleans, and Providence.

In 2013, Baltimore, Cleveland, and Philadelphia were added, and nearly 70 fellows were placed.

In 2014, more than 100 fellows were placed, and an additional four cities—Columbus, Miami, San Antonio, and St. Louis—were added.

In 2015, the organization added Birmingham, Charlotte, Denver, and Pittsburgh and placed more than 120 fellows. 

In 2016, a documentary about Venture for America titled Generation Startup was released, co-directed by Cynthia Wade, an Academy Award winner, and Cheryl Miller Houser. 2016 also saw the addition of Atlanta and Nashville along with nearly 170 fellows placed. 

In 2017, VFA expanded to Kansas City and placed approximately 180 fellows. In mid-2017, Andrew Yang stepped down as CEO. 
From September 2017 to January 2021, Amy Nelson served as CEO.  

In 2021, Eric Somerville was placed as CEO. Tulsa, OK was added as a VFA city.

Approach
Venture For America recruits recent college graduates to work in 14 cities throughout the United States. The goal of the program is for its Fellows to become startup leaders or founders.

After acceptance into the program, Fellows attend a four-week summer professional development program called Training Camp. There, the Fellows are taught and mentored by investors, venture capitalists, and innovation firms in the skills they will need at their companies. The skills they learn include topics of web design, entrepreneurship, and public speaking.

Fellows are then placed in startups in cities like Baltimore, Detroit, and San Antonio in industries such as education innovation, biotechnology, VC firms, media, and clean technology. Since 2012, Venture for America has trained more than 1000 fellows who have worked in 18 cities.

Criticism 
VFA originally aimed to create 100,000 jobs by 2025. Critics of the organization have noted that VFA has not yet created 4,000 jobs, and Yang himself claimed in 2021 that "hundreds" of jobs were created. In June 2019, Theodore Schleifer of Vox wrote that VFA's positive early publicity can be attributed to marketing efforts by Andrew Yang. Yang has justified his goal of creating 100,000 jobs, saying: "In order for organizations to have a very high ceiling, you need to set the goal very, very aggressively." Schleifer also claims that VFA fails to help residents living in inner cities because "Yang thought about how to fix inner cities through the prism of [wealthy donors], rather than listening to what the community wanted."

References

External links
 

Startup accelerators
Non-profit organizations based in New York City
Organizations established in 2011
2011 establishments in New York City
Andrew Yang
Non-profit organizations based in Michigan